Master Prabhakar, (born Prabhakar vaishyan) is an Indian actor, who primarily worked in Tamil cinema, and few Telugu films and acted in about 60 programmes for Doordarshan, between 1977 and 1987 and as  a technician he has worked for few Bollywood films. He made his acting debut with the Tamil film Devalayam directed by G. R. Nathan, and he starred in 150 feature films.

Personal life
Prabhakar was born in Madurai; a city in Tamil Nadu, India. His mother tongue is Saurashtra. His father and mother were originally from Madurai. His father managed several businesses such as photo studio and printing press. His mother, was a housewife taking care of his sister Sumathi and his other six brothers and three sisters. Prabakhar was the first one in the family to enter the film industry. 
In 1966, Prabahakar along with Sumathi moved in with his Aunt to pursue his dreams.

Selected filmography
Actor
1993 Karulina Koogu 
1987 Premaloka (Guest Appearance)
1985 Thayi Mamathe 
1983 Jasoos 999 
1982 Angoor 
1982 Sahasa Simha 
1982 Shriman Shrimati 
1982 Pralaya Rudrudu 
1978 Ghar 
1978 Purana Purush 
1977 Adi Manav 
1977 Susheela 
1976 Fakira 
1973 Anamika 
1973 Baal Mahabharat (as Master Prabhakar)
1972 Bala Bharatam (as Master Prabhakar)
1970 Thirumalai Thenkumari as Ramani
1970 Balaraju Katha (as Master Prabhakar)
1970 Anadhai Anandhan
1970 Maanavan
1969 Iru Koduagal
1969 Vaa Raja Vaa (as Master Prabhakar)
1968 Mujrim Kaun? 
1968 Anbu Vazhi 
1968 Thamarai Nenjam
1967 Engaluckum Kalam Varum
1967 Bama Vijayam 
1966 Marakka Mudiyumaa?
1966 Sadhu Mirandal

As technician
2002 Awara Paagal Deewana (lighting technician) 
1998 Badmaash (spot boy) 
1994 Prem Yog (lighting technician) 
1992 Khiladi (lighting technician) 
1989 Parinda (electrician: N.C. Cine) 
1984 Lorie (light boy) 
1983 Love in Goa (assistant camera) 
1978 Karmayogi (assistant camera) 
1972 Bombay to Goa (camera operator) 
1971 Man Mandir (assistant camera) 
1970 Johny Mera Naam (assistant camera) 
1968 Mera Naam Joker (assistant camera) 
1967 Jewel Thief (assistant operative cameraman) 
1965 Guide (assistant camera)

References

External links
 

1957 births
Living people
Indian male child actors
Male actors from Madurai
Tamil male actors
Male actors in Tamil cinema
Indian male film actors
Tamil film cinematographers
20th-century Indian male actors
21st-century Indian male actors